David Peters (born 1954) is an American paleoartist notable for his fringe views of prehistoric animals, particularly pterosaurs, which he promotes via his blog The Pterosaur Heresies and website ReptileEvolution.com.

Activities in paleontology 

Peters has no formal qualifications in paleontology. During the 1990s and early 2000s Peters was a regular figure at conferences and well known in the field. In 2003, Peters presented an abstract at the Society of Vertebrate Paleontology annual meeting where he claimed that the pterosaur Jeholopterus was hematophagic. By the mid 2000s conflicts between Peters and academic paleontologists meant that appearances at conferences were less frequent and publication in scientific journals more difficult. Peters started The Pterosaur Heresies WordPress blog in 2011. Peters does not usually examine fossils in person like most paleontologists, but instead uses Photoshop on images of fossils. Peters contends that by using image manipulation, specifically a process he refers to as Digital Graphic Segregation, he can see meaningful details in the fossils that paleontologists do not.

Response by paleontologists 
Reception to Peters' ideas by academic paleontologists has been universally negative. Christopher Bennett described Peters' reconstructions of pterosaurs as "outrageously bizarre like Dr. Seuss's imaginary animals" and described his methodology as flawed and non-reproducible due to it being based on low resolution photographs, noting in one instance where Peters had interpreted the presence of a baby pterosaur that was entirely based on marks made during fossil preparation and irregularities in the rock surface, and another where Peters had interpreted a frill based on a rock surface that had been smoothed and painted. Brian Andres recalled that Peters had interpreted marks made when he had prepared a fossil as being of biological significance. Darren Naish wrote extensive rebuttals to Peters' work in 2012 and 2020. Concern has been raised about Peters work misleading non-experts.

In popular culture 

Director Sid Bennett stated in an interview that the flying creatures in The Dinosaur Project were inspired by Peters' interpretations of Jeholopterus.

Bibliography 
As author and artist:

 Giants of Land, Sea & Air, Past & Present (1986)
 A Gallery of Dinosaurs & Other Early Reptiles (1989)
 From the Beginning: the Story of Human Evolution (1991)
 Strange Creatures (1992)

As artist:

 Don Lessem's Raptors! The Nastiest Dinosaurs (1996)
 Don Lessem's Supergiants! The Biggest Dinosaurs (1997)

References 

American artists
1954 births
Living people
Paleoartists
Pseudoscience